Sir George White (1840 – 11 May 1912) was Liberal Party politician in the United Kingdom. He was Member of Parliament (MP) for North West Norfolk from 1900 until his death in 1912, aged 72.

Electoral record

References

External links 
 

1840 births
1912 deaths
Liberal Party (UK) MPs for English constituencies
UK MPs 1900–1906
UK MPs 1906–1910
UK MPs 1910
UK MPs 1910–1918
English tax resisters
Knights Bachelor